The genus Chrotomys contain a unique group of rodents found only in the Philippines, specifically the islands of Luzon, Mindoro, and Sibuyan.  Instead of being predominantly herbivorous or omnivorous like other murines, these rats feed predominantly on invertebrates although they do eat some vegetable matter.  This vermivory is probably the result of a rat-like animal moving into an ecological niche usually filled by shrews.  Shrews and other insectivores are absent on these Philippine islands.

Taxonomy
Rickart et al. (2005) found that C. mindorensis, C. whiteheadi, and C. gonzalesi are closely related whereas C. silaceus and C. sibuyanensis represent earlier offshoots of the genus.  Several authors place C. silaceus in the genus Celaenomys, but Rickart et al. (2005) suggest that neither genetic nor morphometric distance warrant it.

These rats are considered "old endemics" and are probably the result of one of the first colonisations of the Philippine islands.  Other murines colonised the islands at a later time and are more closely related to mainland murines.

Species
Genus Chrotomys - Luzon striped rats
Luzon striped rat, Chrotomys whiteheadi
Mindoro striped rat, Chrotomys mindorensis
Isarog striped shrew-rat, Chrotomys gonzalesi
Blazed Luzon shrew-rat, Chrotomys silaceus
Sibuyan striped shrew-rat, Chrotomys sibuyanensis

Relationships as inferred by cytochrome b

Relationships as inferred by morphology

References
Nowak, R.M. 1999. Walker's Mammals of the World, Vol. 2. Johns Hopkins University Press, London. 
Rickart, E. A., L. R. Heaney, S. M. Goodman, and S. Jansa. 2005. Review of the Philippine genera Chrotomys and Celaenomys (Murinae) and description of a new species. Journal of Mammalogy, 86:415-428.

 
Rodents of the Philippines
Endemic fauna of the Philippines
Fauna of Luzon
Fauna of Mindoro
Fauna of Romblon
Rodent genera
Taxa named by Oldfield Thomas